Love in the 1980s is a 2015 Chinese period romance film directed by Huo Jianqi and based on a novel by Ye Fu. It was released on September 11, 2015.

Cast
Yang Caiyu as Cheng Liwen
Lu Fangsheng as Guan Yubo
Li Shutong as Xiang Yu'e

Plot
Yubo (Lu Fangsheng) has just graduated from university and been assigned to work in a small village in his home province. Here he meets Liwen (Yang Caiyu), who was his high school classmate (and desk mate), and with whom he was in love. He spends the next six months pursuing her, yet despite the obvious attraction and chemistry between them, she rejects his love (again) out of fear that she will hold him back in his career. The back story of political purges causes her to repress her feelings for him. Years later, Yubo runs into Liwen again at their high school reunion. He gets drunk and she agrees to stay with him overnight to take care of him. After they sleep together, she rejects his proposal of love a third time, telling him that he belongs on the road. Another few years pass, and this time when he goes to visit her he learns that she has just died after a brief unhappy marriage to a truck driver. Yubo ends up adopting and raising her daughter.

Reception

Box office
The film earned  at the Chinese box office.

Critical response
Derek Elley of Film Business Asia gave the film a 4 out of 10, saying that "the scenery scores over the human drama".

References

External links

Chinese romance films
2010s romance films
Films directed by Huo Jianqi
Films set in China
Films set in the 1980s
Films based on Chinese novels